"Pink Romance" is the first collaboration single of labelmates K.Will, Sistar, and Boyfriend from Starship Entertainment released under the name 'Starship Planet'. Starship Entertainment stated that this project of digital singles is a way of thanking Starship's fans and was created to help those in need. The special digital single was released on November 25, 2011.

Background and promotion 
K.Will, Sistar, and Boyfriend collaborated as 'Starship Planet' on a festive music video for the digital single "Pink Romance" in which they expressed their love for each other and their fans. A part of the digital single's sales will be donated to charity.

Starship Entertainment also remarked that their artists have volunteered to contribute to the community.

Music videos

Collaboration singles

References 

2012 singles
Korean-language songs
2012 songs
Starship Entertainment singles